Maleki is a surname. Notable people with the surname include:

Christopher Maleki (born 1964), American actor
Iman Maleki (born 1976), Iranian painter
Khalil Maleki (1903–1969), Iranian political figure
Mohammad Maleki (1934–2020), Iranian academic
Mojtaba Maleki (born 1983), Iranian strongman and powerlifter